Peats was an electoral district of the Legislative Assembly in the Australian state of New South Wales from 1973 to 2007. It was replaced by Gosford for the 2007 state election.

Members

Election results

References

Peats
1973 establishments in Australia
Constituencies established in 1973
2007 disestablishments in Australia
Constituencies disestablished in 2007